Viva GR is a radio station broadcasting on 102.8 MHz serving Ptolemaida, Kozani, Western Macedonia. The station is a mixture of Greek fine & pop music. The station launched broadcasting on 1 August 2011. The main audience covers the age groups 15-45 financially independent with high educational level who reside in urban centres.

His music program is determined by the current trends in the Greek music scene while promoting and radio hits that will make a difference in the future.

Slogan
Its slogan is Greek music at its best!

External links
Viva FM Website

Radio stations in Greece